Alexander Thomas Evans (14 February 1917 – 30 August 2009) was an Australian politician.

He was born in Creswick and attended Smeaton State School and Ballarat High School before entering the family business, then becoming a trainee manager at Woolworths. He joined the Liberal Party in 1946, and was a Creswick Shire Councillor from 1956–62. He married Dawn Sim on 11 July 1970.

In 1960 he was elected to the Victorian Legislative Assembly as the member for Ballarat North. He served as a backbencher until his retirement in 1988.

References

1917 births
2009 deaths
20th-century Australian politicians
Liberal Party of Australia members of the Parliament of Victoria
Members of the Victorian Legislative Assembly
People educated at Ballarat High School
People from Creswick, Victoria
People from Ballarat